Canon Press is a Christian publishing house in Moscow, Idaho. It was founded in 1988 as a literature ministry of Christ Church. Canon Press was sold in 2012 and continues to operate as a private company.

References

Christian publishing companies
Publishing companies established in 1988
Mass media in Moscow, Idaho